The Moyva is a river in Perm Krai, Russia, a left tributary of the Vishera. It starts on the south slope of Mount Isherim and flows through Krasnovishersky District. It is a mountain river with rapid flow.

References 

Rivers of Perm Krai